Giorgi Chikhradze (born 1 October 1967) is a Georgian football manager and former member of the Georgian national football team.

Chikhradze played club football for FC Dinamo Sukhumi in the Soviet Second League and Spartak Anapa in the Russian First League.

Chikhradze made 24 appearances for the Georgia national football team from 1994 to 2000.

References

External links

 

1967 births
Living people
People from Gagra District
Footballers from Abkhazia
Ukrainian Premier League players
Ukrainian Second League players
FC Dinamo Sukhumi players
FC Temp Shepetivka players
FC Shakhtar Donetsk players
FC Shakhtar-2 Donetsk players
FC Dinamo Tbilisi players
Georgia (country) international footballers
Football managers from Georgia (country)
Footballers from Georgia (country)
Expatriate footballers from Georgia (country)
Expatriate footballers in China
Expatriate footballers in Ukraine
Expatriate sportspeople from Georgia (country) in Ukraine
Chongqing Liangjiang Athletic F.C. players
Expatriate sportspeople from Georgia (country) in China
Ethnikos Achna FC managers
Association football defenders
FC Spartak-UGP Anapa players
Expatriate sportspeople from Georgia (country) in Cyprus
Expatriate football managers from Georgia (country)
Expatriate football managers in Cyprus
Expatriate football managers in Azerbaijan
Expatriate sportspeople from Georgia (country) in Azerbaijan